Américo Simonetti (born 16 September 1936) is a Chilean equestrian. He competed at the 1964 Summer Olympics, the 1972 Summer Olympics and the 1984 Summer Olympics.

References

1936 births
Living people
Chilean male equestrians
Olympic equestrians of Chile
Equestrians at the 1964 Summer Olympics
Equestrians at the 1972 Summer Olympics
Equestrians at the 1984 Summer Olympics
Pan American Games medalists in equestrian
Pan American Games bronze medalists for Chile
Equestrians at the 1959 Pan American Games
Equestrians at the 1963 Pan American Games
Place of birth missing (living people)
Medalists at the 1963 Pan American Games
20th-century Chilean people